{{safesubst:#invoke:RfD|||month = March
|day =  3
|year = 2023
|time = 01:11
|timestamp = 20230303011147

|content=
REDIRECT Chaos (genus)

}}
Chaos chaos may refer to:
 Chaos chaos, a species of microorganisms in the genus Chaos
 Chaos Chaos, an American indie band
 Chaos Chaos, a 2018 album by the band